Vikersundbakken or Vikersund Hill is a ski flying hill at Vikersund in Modum, Norway. It is one of the two largest purpose-built ski flying hills in the world. Nine world records have been set there, including the current record of 253.5 meters, set by Stefan Kraft. The complex consists of a large hill, a normal hill and several training hills.

The hill originally constructed by Kristian Hovde was opened in 1936 as a large hill. It was rebuilt as ski flying hill in 1964, and was modified in 1989, 1999 and 2010. The present large hill was built in 1988.  Vikersundbakken was the first ski flying hill to receive floodlights in 2006. It has hosted the FIS Ski Flying World Championships in 1977, 1990, 2000, 2012 and 2022.

History

In 1894, Vikersund SK was established and started with ski jumping. Until the 1930s, they used six different ski jumping hills around the area. By then, the club had fostered sufficiently good jumpers that it was proposed to build a proper hill. A committee was established on 19 March 1935 and led by Gustav N. Hovde. At first they found a suitable location north of Heggen. However, they failed to reach an agreement with the land owner. Instead, Hovde proposed using the steep hill close to Heggen Church. After purchasing the land, construction started later in 1935. The original hill was designed by Thunold Hansen. Construction cost 6,290 Norwegian krone (NOK), of which NOK 1000 was borrowed and the rest of financed through private donations.

The hill was inaugurated on 29 January 1936 with a 50-meter jump by Birger Henriksen. The longest jump on the opening day was made by Reidar Andersen, who jumped 86 meters.

The main logistical issue with the events was the poor transport service, with only a narrow road to the hill. During the 1950s, the attendance rose well beyond the former 5,000, forcing the road to be upgraded in 1955. The plans were passed by the club's annual meeting on 13 September, with construction starting in the summer of 1955. The hill was designed by Carl Borgen. Contractors were Brødrene Teigen and since the club did not have sufficient funds, they were willing to wait with the payment until they had. The new hill was inaugurated on 10 March 1956.

The new hill was too large to be regarded as a large hill, but was not large enough to be categorized as a ski flying hill. In 1964, the club appointed a committee led by Ottar Grøtterud to consider an expansion of the hill. There was only to be built one ski flying hill in the Nordic Countries, with the main alternative being Renabakken in Rena. Construction cost NOK 445,000 and was in part financed with a NOK 75,000 grant and NOK 150,000 loan from Modum Municipality, NOK 20,000 from volunteer work, NOK 80,000 from the club, grants from companies and banks and from Buskerud County Municipality, and NOK 100,000 in betting funds. Construction was done by Entreprenør Gunnar Sterkebye. On the landing slope and out-run,  of earthwork had to be moved. The hill was inaugurated on 13 March 1966.

The next upgrade of the venue were minor upgrades ahead of the 1977 World Championships. Ahead of the 1990 World Championships, the venue was again renovated. However, to secure better recruitment, the venue also received a new normal hill with a K point of K-90.

The hill was rebuilt for the 2012 Ski Flying World Championships. It was the first in the world with a hill size of 225 meters, making Vikersundbakken the largest ski flying hill in the world at the time. It has been built further into the terrain with sidewalls made of natural gravel to avoid wind problems during competitions. Furthermore, it has been slanted slightly to the south from the inrun area to further reduce wind problems. The hill was ready for the 2011 Trial Ski Flying World Championships held on 11–13 February 2011.

The old inrun was demolished in 2010. The engineers of the new and larger hill were Slovenians Janez Gorišek and his son Sebastjan. Janez, together with his brother Lado, is most famous for creating Letalnica Bratov Gorišek in Planica, previously the largest hill in the world at HS 215, before Vikersundbakken was reprofiled and enlarged in 2011. Janez is usually named as the 'father' of modern ski flying and is also known as an expert on ski flying hills.

At the trial ski flying championship, Johan Remen Evensen jumped 243 meters to set a new world record during the first official training on 11 February 2011. Later, during qualification, Evensen improved the world record to 246.5 meters.

During autumn 2011 the hill was further improved with a different radius at HS 225, increasing the ability to stand on greater lengths. Additionally the jump itself was cut a meter short because of decreased inrun speed needed by the jumpers. During the 2011 event, it was deemed necessary to add several inrun gates the hill below gate 1 due to better conditions not anticipated by the organisers during construction in 2010. A total of five gates were added. Gregor Schlierenzauer praised the hill during interviews, calling it the best hill in the world. Evensen was also extremely satisfied with the hill, calling it "perfect". The K point was increased from K-195 in 2012 to K-200 in time for the 2015 event, resulting in two new world records on the same weekend: Peter Prevc jumped 250 m (820 ft) and became to first to ever surpass the 250 m mark, and this was followed by Anders Fannemel with 251.5 m (825 ft) the next day. In a training round prior to Fannemel's jump, Dimitry Vassiliev jumped 254 m (833 ft) but fell hard upon landing, rendered his jump invalid as a world record.

Events 
Opened as large hill in 1936 and converted into flying hill in 1966.

 
The inaugural competition was held on 25 February 1936 in front of 5,000 spectators. The hill was used for a single major competition each year, Vikersundrennet. Arnold Kongsgård beat the hill record in 1946 when he jumped  and then beat it with another meter two years later.

Starting on 12 March 1967, the club introduced the International Ski Flying Week. On 11 March 1968, the tournament was canceled due to strong winds, although 22,500 people had come to spectate. In 1973, the International Ski Flying Week was canceled because of lack of snow. On this hill were also two Continental Cup competitions in 2004 both won by Austrian Roland Müller.

In the late 1960s, the International Ski Federation (FIS) started planning a world championship in ski flying. The Norwegian Ski Federation was opposed to this. Vikersundbakken was awarded the fourth FIS Ski Flying World Championships, held in 1977. Vikersundbakken was used in the FIS Ski Jumping World Cup in 1980, 1983 and 1986.

The normal hill was used for the Norwegian Ski Championships in 1989. As there was no snow,  was freighted by train from Finse via the Bergen Line and up from Vikersund Station by truck.

Hill record

Men

Ladies

Technical data

References
Bibliography

External links

 Official site
 The Skiflying Hill - Technical Data

Ski jumping venues in Norway
Ski flying venues
Modum
Sports venues in Viken
1936 establishments in Norway
Sports venues completed in 1936
Raw Air